Edmund Francis Gibbons (September 16, 1868 – June 19, 1964) was an American prelate of the Roman Catholic Church. He served as Bishop of Albany from 1919 to 1954.

Biography
Edmund Gibbons was born in White Plains, New York, to Irish immigrants James and Joanna (née Ray) Gibbons. His father was a stonecutter who helped build the New York State Capitol.

Gibbons attended The College and Seminary of Our Lady of Angels at Niagara, and continued his studies at the Pontifical North American College in Rome, where he was ordained to the priesthood on May 27, 1893. He then served as secretary to Bishop Stephen V. Ryan (1893-1896), superintendent of Catholic schools in the Buffalo Diocese (1900-1916), and pastor of St. Vincent's Church in Attica (1904-1915). He was pastor of St. Teresa's Church in Buffalo from 1916 to 1919.

On March 10, 1919, Gibbons was appointed the sixth Bishop of Albany by Pope Benedict XV. He received his episcopal consecration on the following March 25 from Archbishop Giovanni Bonzano, with Bishops John Grimes and Thomas Walsh serving as co-consecrators. He guided the diocese through the Great Depression and World War II, and oversaw a great increase in religious vocations and parishes. In 1934, he was chairman of the New York State Catholic Welfare Committee.

He also established The College of Saint Rose, Siena College, Mater Christi Seminary, 22 high schools, 82 grade schools, and the diocesan newspaper, The Evangelist.

On May 27, 1953, Bishop Gibbons celebrated the 60th anniversary of his ordination. As the oldest living bishop, he was dean of the American hierarchy.
After thirty-five years as bishop, Gibbons retired on November 10, 1954 to a simple apartment in the Mater Christi seminary; he was named Titular Bishop of Verbe on the same date. He died at age 95.

References

Episcopal succession

1868 births
1964 deaths
Roman Catholic bishops of Albany
Niagara University alumni
People from White Plains, New York
20th-century Roman Catholic bishops in the United States
American Roman Catholic clergy of Irish descent